Leo Robert (January 16, 1921 – November 28, 2016) was a French Canadian bodybuilder. At one time, he was billed as "America's most muscular man". He won the 1955 Mr. Universe.

Early life

Leo Robert was born in Montreal on January 16, 1921. At a young age, Robert was profoundly interested in sports, particularly hockey. By being an athlete, he learned the value of sportsmanship and hard work.

Career
Robert was introduced to bodybuilding by former bodybuilder Ben Weider. Robert realized he did not want to be cooped up in an office anymore. Throughout the 1950s and early 1960s, Robert competed and was very successful in bodybuilding.

Family
Robert had two brothers and two sisters. His mother was raised on a farm, was a great cook, and was a devout Catholic. His father was an auto mechanic who owned his own garage.

References

1921 births
2016 deaths
Canadian bodybuilders
People associated with physical culture
Professional bodybuilders
Sportspeople from Montreal